What Happened may refer to:

 What Happened (Clinton book), 2017 book by Hillary Clinton
 What Happened (McClellan book), 2008 autobiography by Scott McClellan
 "What Happened", a song by Sublime from the album 40oz. to Freedom
 "What Happened", an episode of One Day at a Time (2017 TV series)

See also
What's Happening (disambiguation)